Tyrrell Lake is a saline lake in Alberta, Canada.

Tyrrell Lake
County of Warner No. 5